The Ministry of Economic Development and Digitalization of Moldova is one of the fourteen ministries of the Government of Moldova.

History
Ministry of Economy of Moldova was founded on 1 June 1990, as Ministry of National Economy of SSR Moldova, while Moldova was part of Soviet Union. Over years, it was restructured a few times and renamed, as follows:
Ministry of Economy and Finance (1991–1992)
Ministry of Economy (1992–1997)
Ministry of Economy and Reforms (1997–2001)
Ministry of Economy (2001–2005)
Ministry of Economy and Trade (2005–2009)
Ministry of Economy (2009–2017)
Ministry of Economy and Infrastructure (2017–2021)
Ministry of Economy (2021–2023)
Ministry of Economic Development and Digitalization (2023–present)

In 2017 as part of the government reform in Moldova, the Ministry of Economy was renamed to Ministry of Economy and Infrastructure, absorbing the Ministry of Transport and Roads Infrastructure, and the Ministry of Informational Technologies and Communications, becoming their legal successor. Also this ministry took the domain of constructions from the former Minister of Construction and Regional Development.

List of ministers

References

Economy and Infrastructure
Moldova
Moldova
Moldova
Transport organizations based in Moldova